A gallotannin is any of a class of molecules belonging to the hydrolysable tannins. Gallotannins are polymers formed when gallic acid, a polyphenol monomer, esterifies and binds with the hydroxyl group of a polyol carbohydrate such as glucose.

Metabolism
Gallate 1-beta-glucosyltransferase uses UDP-glucose and gallate  to produce UDP and 1-galloyl-beta-D-glucose.
Beta-glucogallin O-galloyltransferase uses 1-O-galloyl-beta-D-glucose to produce D-glucose and 1-O,6-O-digalloyl-beta-D-glucose.
Beta-glucogallin-tetrakisgalloylglucose O-galloyltransferase uses 1-O-galloyl-beta-D-glucose and 1,2,3,6-tetrakis-O-galloyl-beta-D-glucose to produce D-glucose and 1,2,3,4,6-pentakis-O-galloyl-beta-D-glucose (1,2,3,4,6-penta-O-galloyl-β-D-glucose, the common precursor of gallotannins and the related ellagitannins).

Tannase is a key enzyme in the degradation of gallotannins that uses digallic acid and H2O to produce gallic acid.

See also
 List of antioxidants in food

References

Gallotannins